Camila de Paula Brait (born October 28, 1988) is a volleyball player from Frutal, Brazil, who plays as a libero. She currently defends Osasco Voleibol Clube and is retired from the Brazilian national team.

She won the silver medal while representing Brazil at the 2020 Summer Olympics.

Career
She started her career defending URS/Sacramento. After that; she played in several other teams, which were SESI/Uberlândia, Praia Clube-MG, São Caetano/MonBijou and Osasco, named Finasa/Osasco at the time she joined the club.

Playing with Osasco, Brait won the gold medal and the Best Libero award in the 2012 FIVB Club World Championship held in Doha, Qatar.

Brait won the silver medal in the 2014 FIVB Club World Championship after her club lost 0–3 to the Russian Dinamo Kazan in the championship match.

International career 
Camila Brait played her first international game against Venezuela. Camila Brait participated in the 2010 FIVB Volleyball Women's World Championship, held in Japan, helping her country finish in the second position.

Brait won the Best Receiver, Best Digger, and Best Libero awards when her national team won the silver medal at the 2015 Pan American Games being defeated in the championship match 0–3 to the United States.

She was selected to the national squad to compete in the women's volleyball tournament at the 2020 Summer Olympics. She won the silver medal at the 2020 Summer Olympics after Brazil lost 0–3 to the United States in the gold medal match of the women's volleyball tournament.

Awards

Individuals
 2006 U20 South American Championship – "Best Receiver"
 2006 U20 South American Championship – "Best Libero"
 2007 Pan-American Cup – "Best Digger"
 2008 Pan-American Cup – "Best Digger"
 2009 South American Club Championship – "Best Digger"
 2009–10 Brazilian Superliga – "Best Libero"
 2010 South American Club Championship – "Best Libero"
 2010–11 Brazilian Superliga – "Best Receiver"
 2011 South American Club Championship – "Best Libero"
 2011–12 Brazilian Superliga – "Best Receiver"
 2012 South American Club Championship – "Best Libero"
 2012 FIVB Club World Championship – "Best Libero"
 2012–13 Brazilian Superliga – "Best Digger"
 2014–15 Brazilian Superliga – "Best Receiver"
 2015 Pan American Games – "Best Libero"
 2015 Pan American Games – "Best Digger"
 2015 Pan American Games – "Best Receiver"
 2018–19 Brazilian Superliga – "Best Libero"
 2020-21 Brazilian Superliga – "Best Libero"

Club

 2009 South American Club Championship –  Champion, with Sollys Osasco 
 2010 South American Club Championship –  Champion, with Sollys Osasco 
 2011 South American Club Championship –  Champion, with Sollys Osasco 
 2012 South American Club Championship –  Champion, with Sollys Osasco
 2014 South American Club Championship –  Runner-up, with Molico Osasco
 2015 South American Club Championship –  Runner-up, with Molico Osasco
 2010 FIVB Club World Championship –  Runner-up, with Sollys Nestlé Osasco
 2011 FIVB Club World Championship –  Bronze medal, with Sollys Nestlé Osasco
 2012 FIVB Club World Championship –  Champion, with Sollys Nestlé Osasco
 2014 FIVB Club World Championship –  Runner-up, with Molico Osasco
 2009-2010 Brazilian Superliga –  Champion, with Osasco
 2011-12 Brazilian Superliga –  Champion, with Osasco
 2008 Brazilian Cup –  Champion, with Osasco
 2014 Brazilian Cup –  Champion, with Osasco
 2018 Brazilian Cup –  Champion, with Osasco

References

1988 births
Living people
Brazilian women's volleyball players
Sportspeople from Minas Gerais
Volleyball players at the 2015 Pan American Games
Pan American Games silver medalists for Brazil
Pan American Games medalists in volleyball
Liberos
Medalists at the 2015 Pan American Games
Volleyball players at the 2020 Summer Olympics
Olympic volleyball players of Brazil
Medalists at the 2020 Summer Olympics
Olympic medalists in volleyball
Olympic silver medalists for Brazil